Ermelinda Zamba (born 28 August 1981) is a Mozambican former swimmer, who specialized in sprint freestyle events. Zamba qualified for the women's 50 m freestyle at the 2004 Summer Olympics in Athens, by receiving a Universality place from FINA, in an entry time of 30.33. She cleared a 30-second barrier, and posted a lifetime best of 29.34 to lead the third heat, edging out Madagascar's Aina Andriamanjatoarimanana in a close race by one hundredth of a second (0.01). Zamba failed to advance into the semifinals, as she placed fifty-fifth overall out of 75 swimmers on the last day of preliminaries.

References

External links

1981 births
Living people
Olympic swimmers of Mozambique
Swimmers at the 2004 Summer Olympics
Mozambican female freestyle swimmers
Sportspeople from Maputo